The Sơn Vi culture is the name given to a culture of the late Palaeolithic and early Mesolithic Age in Vietnam.

Sơn Vi (vi) itself is a village (xã) in Lâm Thao District, Phú Thọ Province. Sơn Vi is the official Chinese character tên chữ name of the village, it also has a demotic Vietnamese tên nôm name, kẻ Vây.

References

Ancient Vietnam
Archaeological cultures of Southeast Asia
Archaeological cultures in Vietnam
Paleolithic cultures of Asia
Mesolithic cultures of Asia